The Flying Scot is a 1957 British crime film produced and directed by Compton Bennett and starring Lee Patterson, Kay Callard and Alan Gifford. The film was released in the U.S. as Mailbag Robbery.

Plot
A gang plans to steal a half-a-million pounds' worth of banknotes from an express train.

Cast
 Lee Patterson as Ronnie
 Kay Callard as Jackie
 Alan Gifford as Phil
 Margaret Withers as Middle-Aged Lady
 Mark Baker as Gibbs
 Jeremy Bodkin as Charlie, the boy
 Gerald Case as Guard
 Margaret Gordon as Drunk's Wife
 John Lee as Young Man
 Kerry Jordan as Drunk
 John Dearth as Father

Critical reception
TV Guide wrote, "The suspense is well built in this finely constructed feature": while Sky Movies called it "An unheralded low-budget thriller which contains twice as much suspense as many more lavish productions. Taut, crisp, with a conspicuous absence of big name stars, it is a prime example of the British B movie at its best. With a bit of Hitchcock here and a touch of Rififi there (a 15-minute sequence is acted in complete silence), and a good touch of The Window (1949) with a boy who is a liar and nobody believes him, but... the suspense is built up to a climax which leaves one hoping that just this once, crime will be allowed to pay."

It was one of 15 films selected by Steve Chibnall and Brian McFarlane in The British 'B' Film, their survey of British B films, as among the most meritorious of the B films made in Britain between World War II and 1970. They note that it was shot in just three weeks on a budget of £18,000 and describe it as "a film not just of suspense, but of real fascination".

References

External links

1957 films
British crime films
1957 crime films
Films directed by Compton Bennett
Films set on trains
1950s English-language films
1950s British films